Fabien Toulmé (born 1980) is a French comic book author.

Biography 
Fabien Toulmé was born in Orléans. He studied  civil engineering and  urbanism.  In his last year of studies in France, Fabien was able to do an interchange year, choosing the Federal University of Paraíba, in Brazil, and moved to João Pessoa. He opened a engineering firm in Fortaleza and worked as an engineer in Brazil, Benin, and the French overseas departments of French Guyana and Guadeloupe.  He practiced this activity without any particular passion and during his stay in Brazil he met his wife, with whom he had two children. A few encounters in the world of Brazilian comics encouraged him to turn to this field. Back to France, he lived for a time in a Parisian suburb (banlieue)..

From 2009, installed in Aix-en-Provence, he started publishing his work on the web and collaborated with magazines such as Lanfeust Mag (where he published a series called Heureux qui comme Alex), Spirou with L'Atelier Mastodonte, Psikopat and Wakou. He then joined Thomas Cadène on his webcomic entitled Les Autres Gens. He also participated in the development of collective works such as Vivre dessous and Alimentation Générale. Noticed by a collection director at Delcourt Editions in 2013, he worked as an engineer during the day and, in parallel, drew his first graphic novel during the evenings.

From 2014, his individual albums got published with Ce n'est pas toi que j'attendais (éditions Delcourt), an autobiographical comic book relating the impact on his life of the birth of his daughter Julia, who had Down's syndrome undetected during his partner's pregnancy. In 2017, Les Deux Vies de Baudouin was published, a graphic novel about a man who, discovering he has an incurable cancer, decides to make his dreams come true.  The same year, Toulmé published Venenum. La grande histoire du poison, an educational comic book, as part of an exhibition in Lyon.Toulmé quit his job as an engineer and became a full-time comic book author.

In 2018, Delcourt published L'Odyssée d'Hakim (Hakim's Odyssey), a comic book series on the story of a Syrian refugee. Volume 1 was nominated for the Prix France Info 2019. Volume 3 won in 2021 the prix France Info for news and reportage comics  and, in 2022, the Prix Inspireo des Lycéens.

Works 

 Ce n'est pas toi que j'attendais, 2014, édition Delcourt, coll. Encrages. 
 Les Deux Vies de Baudouin, 2017, édition Delcourt, coll. Mirages. 
 Venenum. La grande histoire du poison, 2017, édition Lyon BD. 
 L'Odyssée d'Hakim, T1 : De la Syrie à la Turquie, 2018, édition Delcourt, coll. Encrages. 
 English edition: Hakim's Odyssey: Book 1: From Syria to Turkey, 2021,  translator Hanna Chute , Graphic Mundi - Psu Press, ISBN 978-1637790007
 L'Odyssée d'Hakim, T2 : De la Turquie à la Grèce, 2019, édition Delcourt, coll. Encrages. 
 English edition: Hakim's Odyssey: Book 2: From Turkey to Greece, 2022,  translator Hanna Chute , Graphic Mundi - Psu Press, ISBN 978-1637790083                                    ‎                              
 L'Odyssée d'Hakim, T3 : De la Macédoine à la France, 2020, édition Delcourt, coll. Encrages.
 English edition: Hakim's Odyssey: Book 3: From Macedonia to France, 2022,  translator Hanna Chute , Graphic Mundi - Psu Press,   ISBN 978-1637790311                                    ‎                             
 Cher dictateur (writing), art by Caloucalou, colors by Philippe Ory, Audie / Fluide Glacial, August 2019 
 Suzette ou le grand amour (writing and art), Delcourt, coll. Mirages, June 2021 
 Les reflets du monde: en lutte, Delcourt, coll. Encrages, June 2022 (ISBN 9782413038993)

Awards 

 2018 : 2018 : Prix Région Centre - Val-de-Loire of the Festival bd BOUM for Hakim's Odyssey;
 2020 : Schlingo prize,with Caloucalou, for Cher dictateur.
 2021 :France Info Prize for news and reportage comics for Hakim's Odyssey, t.3 From Macedonia to France.
 2022 Inspireo des Lycéens  Prize for Hakim's Odyssey, t.3: From Macedonia to France

References 

French comics writers
French cartoonists
Federal University of Paraíba alumni
1980 births
French comics artists
People from Orléans
Living people